St Audries Park Manor house at West Quantoxhead in the Quantock Hills of Somerset, England, was the manor house of the Acland family. It was rebuilt on the site of an earlier house, between 1835 and 1870 and has had a number of owners since Sir Alexander sold the building.

The property was divided in 1934, when the house was sold and turned into St Audries School, which remained in occupation until 1990. In 1996 the house was sold to the Amitabha Buddhist Centre.

It was sold again in 2001.

The house and parkland are listed Grade II on the Register of Historic Parks and Gardens of special historic interest in England. They are also on the Heritage at Risk Register.

It is now run as a wedding venue.

References

West Somerset
Grade II listed buildings in West Somerset
Country houses in Somerset
Structures on the Heritage at Risk register in Somerset
Grade II listed parks and gardens in Somerset
Gardens in Somerset